Alexander Kitman Ho (born 1950), known as A. Kitman Ho, is an American film producer.

He was born in Hong Kong, and emigrated with his family to the United States when he was 5 years old. He grew up in New York City's Chinatown neighborhood. After graduating from Goddard College in Vermont with a master's degree in Cinema. He continued his studies at New York University's Tisch School of the Arts.

Ho has produced many of Oliver Stone's films, such as Platoon, Wall Street, Talk Radio, Born on the Fourth of July, The Doors, JFK, and Heaven & Earth.

Filmography
He was a producer in all films unless otherwise noted.

Film

Production manager

Second unit director 
 Hotel Rwanda (2004)
 Reservation Road (2007)

Location management
 The Warriors (1979)
 The First Deadly Sin (1980)

Thanks
 Thirteen Conversations About One Thing (2001)

Television

Production manager

References

External links

A. Kitman Ho - Biography and Filmography - Hollywood.com

American film producers
Hong Kong film producers
Hong Kong emigrants to the United States
Businesspeople from New York City
1950 births
Living people
Golden Globe Award-winning producers